
Gmina Komarów-Osada is a rural gmina (administrative district) in Zamość County, Lublin Voivodeship, in eastern Poland.

Villages
Gmina Komarów-Osada contains the villages and settlements of Antoniówka, Huta Komarowska, Janówka Wschodnia, Janówka Zachodnia, Kadłubiska, Komarów Dolny, Komarów Górny, Komarów-Osada, Komarów-Wieś, Kraczew, Krzywystok, Krzywystok-Kolonia, Księżostany, Księżostany-Kolonia, Ruszczyzna, Śniatycze, Sosnowa-Dębowa, Swaryczów, Tomaszówka, Tuczapy, Wolica Brzozowa, Wolica Brzozowa-Kolonia, Wolica Śniatycka, Zubowice and Zubowice-Kolonia.

Neighbouring gminas
Gmina Komarów-Osada is bordered by the gminas of Krynice, Łabunie, Miączyn, Rachanie, Sitno and Tyszowce.

References

Polish official population figures 2006

Komarow-Osada
Gmina Komarow Osada